Junda Chen, also known as Hagen Troy, is a Singaporean musician and composer. He has written songs for famous singers in the Asia music industry such as Ocean Ou, Harlem Yu, Wilbur Pan, Jocie Guo, Rachel Liang and Jolin Tsai.

His album Answer was recommended by Straits Time's Life. It was also the soundtrack of drama "Bountiful Blessings", starring popular Hong Kong actress, Jessica Hsuan during the year.

HagenTroy was mentioned by MyPaper
as an "artist to note" in May 2013.

Work

In 2011, Troy made a  crossover into the mainstream Chinese Pop market, a releasing his debut Album “Answer”.

He was a Health Promotion Board's Breathe Ambassador in April 2011. He also composed and sang their theme song, "The Choice is mine".

References

Year of birth missing (living people)
Living people
Singaporean people of Chinese descent
Singaporean composers
21st-century Singaporean male singers
Singaporean Mandopop singers